Sainte-Marie 1st Canton Nord is a former canton in the Arrondissement of La Trinité on Martinique. It had 7,017 inhabitants (2012). It was disbanded in 2015. The canton comprised part of the commune of Sainte-Marie.

References

Cantons of Martinique